In physics, a spherical pendulum is a higher dimensional analogue of the pendulum. It consists of a mass  moving without friction on the surface of a sphere. The only forces acting on the mass are the reaction from the sphere and gravity.

Lagrangian mechanics

Routinely, in order to write down the kinetic  and potential  parts of the Lagrangian  in arbitrary generalized coordinates the position of the mass is expressed along Cartesian axes. Here, following the conventions shown in the diagram,

.
Next, time derivatives of these coordinates are taken, to obtain velocities along the axes

.
Thus,

and

The Lagrangian, with constant parts removed, is 

The Euler–Lagrange equation involving the polar angle 

gives

and

When  the equation reduces to the differential equation for the motion of a simple gravity pendulum.

Similarly, the Euler–Lagrange equation involving the azimuth ,

gives
.
The last equation shows that angular momentum around the vertical axis,   is conserved. The factor  will play a role in the Hamiltonian formulation below.

.

The azimuth , being absent from the Lagrangian, is a cyclic coordinate, which implies that its conjugate momentum is a constant of motion.

Hamiltonian mechanics

The Hamiltonian is

where conjugate momenta are

and

.

In terms of coordinates and momenta it reads

Hamilton's equations will give time evolution of coordinates and momenta in four first-order differential equations

Momentum  is a constant of motion. That is a consequence of the rotational symmetry of the system around the vertical axis.

Trajectory 

Trajectory of the mass on the sphere can be obtained from the expression for the total energy

by noting that the horizontal component of angular momentum  is a constant of motion, independent of time. This is true because neither gravity nor the reaction from the sphere act in directions that would affect this component of angular momentum.

Hence

which leads to an elliptic integral of the first kind for 

and an elliptic integral of the third kind for 

.

The angle  lies between two circles of latitude, where

.

See also
Foucault pendulum
Conical pendulum
Newton's three laws of motion
Pendulum
Pendulum (mathematics)
Routhian mechanics

References

Further reading
 
 
 
 
 
 
 
 

Pendulums